Diospyros beccarioides is a tree in the family Ebenaceae. Twigs are reddish brown when young. Inflorescences bear three or more flowers. The tree is named for its resemblance to Diospyros beccarii, a synonym of Diospyros sumatrana. Habitat is lowland limestone hills from sea level to  altitude. D. beccarioides is found in Sumatra, Borneo and Sulawesi.

References

beccarioides
Plants described in 2001
Trees of Sumatra
Trees of Borneo
Trees of Sulawesi